George Alphonsus Cooper (7 March 1925 – 16 November 2018) was an English actor and voice artist. He died in November 2018 at the age of 93.

Early life
Cooper was born in Leeds, the son of William and Eleanor (née Dobson) Cooper. His father worked on the railways as a train guard. The younger Cooper began to train as an electrical engineer, but enlisted in the Royal Artillery during the Second World War, acting with the Royal Artillery Depot Players in India.

Stage career
After a short period as a draughtsman he joined Theatre Workshop, then based in Manchester. Joan Littlewood's company, also based in Glasgow for a time, then concentrated on performing its productions on tour. The company's permanent base became London's Theatre Royal Stratford East in 1953, the opening production being Twelfth Night with Cooper as Malvolio and Harry H. Corbett as Sir Andrew Aguecheek. Both men were often cast in antagonist roles in Theatre Workshop productions during the next few years. Cooper left the company in 1955. Cooper played Geoffrey Fisher, the stern father of the eponymous antihero Billy Liar, in the original West End stage production in 1960. His wife, Shirley Jones (married 1955), who worked as a Theatre Workshop costume assistant, did not like his absences during the evenings, and Cooper himself found eight performances of Billy Liar a week to be a strain. Increasingly he turned to television for work.

Television and film career
He had a recurring role in Coronation Street as Willie Piggott, a dubious businessman, between 1964 and 1971. One of his other regular roles was as the caretaker Mr. Griffiths in the long-running children's TV series Grange Hill. from 1985 to 1992. He returned to the role of Geoffrey Fisher in the sitcom version of Billy Liar (1973–74).

Among Cooper's other television credits are Danger Man, Z-Cars, Dixon of Dock Green, No Hiding Place, Doctor Who (in the serial The Smugglers), Angel Pavement, Softly, Softly, The Avengers, The Saint, Randall and Hopkirk (Deceased), The Troubleshooters, Steptoe and Son, A Family at War, Doomwatch, Public Eye, Budgie, Bless This House, Sykes, Rising Damp, The New Avengers, Some Mothers Do 'Ave 'Em, All Creatures Great and Small, Poor Little Rich Girls, Juliet Bravo, When the Boat Comes In, Terry and June, Taggart, Casualty and as Walter Petigrew in Heartbeat.

Cooper had roles in many films including: Violent Playground (1958), Hell Is a City (1960), The Cracksman (1963), Nightmare (1964), Dracula Has Risen from the Grave (1968) with Christopher Lee and the film version of Bless This House (1972) with Sid James.

Selected filmography

 Men of Two Worlds (1946) - Orchestra Conductor
 Okinawa (1952) - Yeoman (uncredited)
 The Passing Stranger (1954) - Charlie
 Jumping for Joy (1956) - Farmer (uncredited)
 Sailor Beware! (1956) - Petty Officer (uncredited)
 The Secret Place (1957) - Harry
 Miracle in Soho (1957) - Foreman
 Violent Playground (1958) - Chief Inspector
 A Night to Remember (1958) - Purser Ernest G. F. Brown, SS Carpathia (uncredited)
 Friends and Neighbours (1959) - George Wheeler
 Hell Is a City (1960) - Doug Savage
 Follow That Horse! (1960) - Rudd
 In the Doghouse (1961) - Veterinary Examiner -  (voice overdubbed by Scottish accent)
 The Brain (1962) - Thomas Gabler
 The Wild and the Willing (1962) - 1st Customer
 The Cracksman (1963) - Fred
 Tom Jones (1963) - Mr. Fitzpatrick
 Nightmare (1964) - John
 The Bargee (1964) - Official in Office
 Ferry Cross the Mersey (1964) - Mr. Lumsden
 Life at the Top (1965) - Graffham
 Smashing Time (1967) - Irishman
 The Strange Affair (1968) - Supt. Kingley
 Dracula Has Risen from the Grave (1968) - Landlord
 Start the Revolution Without Me (1970) - Dr. Duval
 Cromwell (1970) - (scenes deleted)
 The Rise and Rise of Michael Rimmer (1970) - Blacket
 What Became of Jack and Jill? (1972) - Trouncer
 Bless This House (1972) - Mr Wilson
 The Vault of Horror (1973) - (scenes deleted)
 The Black Windmill (1974) - Pincus (uncredited)
 Dick Deadeye, or Duty Done (1975) - The Pirate King (voice)
 Trial by Combat (1976) - 2nd Leather Jerkin

References

External links
 

1925 births
2018 deaths
English male stage actors
English male television actors
Male actors from Leeds
British Army personnel of World War II
Royal Artillery soldiers
Military personnel from Leeds